Plethodontohyla bipunctata is a species of frog in the family Microhylidae.
It is endemic to Madagascar.
Its natural habitats are subtropical or tropical moist lowland forests and heavily degraded former forest.
It is threatened by habitat loss.

References

bipunctata
Endemic frogs of Madagascar
Taxa named by Jean Marius René Guibé
Amphibians described in 1974
Taxonomy articles created by Polbot